Senator O'Keefe may refer to:

Dan O'Keefe (politician), California State Senate
Michael O'Keefe (Louisiana politician) (born 1932), Louisiana State Senate